Aapo Mäenpää (born 14 January 1998) is a Finnish professional footballer who plays for Ilves, as a right back.

Club career
On 4 November 2021, he signed a two-year contract with Ilves, starting in 2022.

References

1998 births
Living people
Finnish footballers
FC Hämeenlinna players
FC Haka players
IFK Mariehamn players
FC Ilves players
Kakkonen players
Ykkönen players
Veikkausliiga players
Association football defenders
People from Hämeenlinna
Sportspeople from Kanta-Häme